Shazdeh Mahan Garden ( Bāgh-e Shāzdeh Mahan) meaning the Prince`s Garden in Mahan  is a historical Persian garden located near (6 km away from) Mahan in Kerman province, Iran.

The garden is 5.5 hectares with a rectangular shape and a wall around it. It consists of an entrance structure and gate at the lower end and a two-floor residential structure at the upper end. The distance between these two is ornamented with water fountains that are engined by the natural incline of the land. The garden is a fine example of Persian gardens that take advantage of suitable natural climate.

A garden was built for Mohammad Hassan Khan Sardari Iravani ca. 1850 on this site, and was entirely remodeled and extended around 1870 by Abdolhamid Mirza Naserodolleh during the eleven years of his governorship in the Qajar dynasty. The current visible structure dates almost entirely to this second period, and is formally related to similar gardens designed by NaseroDolleh in Tehran. (Bagh Chal in Niavaran) The construction was left unfinished, due to the death of Abdolhamid Mirza in the early 1890s.
Spread over 5.5 hectares, Shazdeh Garden is rectangular in shape. It has an entrance and a gate at the lower end and a two-floor residential structure at the upper end. The distance between these two is lined by water fountains. amongst other gardens, on the UNESCO World Heritage List and the Shazdeh Garden was finally inscribed in June 2011.

Gallery

References

iranreview.or

External links

Tishineh
Mahan Summer Residing Places, Kerman at irantouronline.com

World Heritage Sites in Iran
Parks in Iran
Architecture in Iran
Persian gardens in Iran
Tourist attractions in Kerman Province
Buildings and structures in Kerman Province